Taiwan Competitiveness Forum (TCF) is a policy think tank in Taiwan led by academics supporting Chinese Unification.

History
The group was founded on August 15, 2007, by scholars who "worried about the deadlock situation of the cross-strait relationship [...] and draining competitive power in the country". The chairman of the group at the time was Pang Chien-kuo, a Kuomintang politician.

During the 2014 Taiwanese local elections, Taiwan Competitiveness Forum published an opinion poll about Ko Wen-je's MG149 controversy. The opinion poll, however, is heavily criticised for push poll:

Liao Yu-Tseng (廖育嶒), master of political science at National Chengchi University, described the questions as "leading", indicated that they "cannot represent how voters truly think". The TCF poll showed that 40.1% believe that Ko Wen-je is innocent and 33.9% do not believe it; while TVBS was 47% vs 22% and The Storm Media was 68% vs 27%. 

During the candidates' debate in the election, Peng Jin-peng (彭錦鵬), then chairman of the TCF, asked Ko Wen-je how can he be a mayor with an idea "exempt from the rule of law", while asked Lien Sheng-wen why he "risk his life" to elect the mayor and compared him to Michael Bloomberg. A group of students at National Taiwan University questioned Peng Jin-peng's behaviour, while Peng Jin-peng defended his behaviour.

See also
 Politics of the Republic of China

References

External links
 

2007 establishments in Taiwan
Cross-Strait relations
Think tanks based in Taiwan
Think tanks established in 2007